Rensselaer Morse Lewis (November 9, 1820 – December 16, 1888) was an American merchant from Fond du Lac, Wisconsin who served a single one-year term in 1873 as a Liberal Reform Party member of the Wisconsin State Assembly from Fond du Lac County, Wisconsin.

Early life 
Lewis was born November 9, 1820 in Morrisville, New York, the son of Conway Lewis and Adelia (née Curtis) Lewis. He received an academic education and became a grain merchant and wholesaler.

Career
In 1853, he came to Wisconsin, settling in Fond du Lac. He was listed as a produce dealer in 1867. From 1867 to 1869 he served as postmaster of that city. He declared bankruptcy in 1868 and his home burned down in 1872.

Legislative service 
In 1872, he was elected to serve in the 26th Wisconsin Legislature representing the 2nd Fond du Lac County Assembly district (consisting of the City of Fond du Lac itself, and the Towns of Fond du Lac, Lamartine and Oakfield) as a candidate of the newly formed Reform Party, with 1,754 votes to 1,725 for Republican incumbent Elihu Colman. Lewis was assigned to the standing committees on ways and means, and on engrossed bills.

He was not a candidate for re-election in 1873, and was succeeded by Democrat Thomas Weeks (the Reform Party had no candidate in the 1873 race).

Personal life
On July 30, 1845, he was married to Helen Maria Williams (b. 1826).  In 1859, his wife had her leg broken in a train accident aboard the Chicago and Northwestern Railroad. Together, they were the parents of:

 Mary Elizabeth Lewis (b. 1846), who married Ephraim Leverett Patch
 Ella Marie Lewis (b. 1848), who married Kelsey M. Adams.
 Adelaide Olive Lewis (b. 1850), who married Harvey Bradford Dodd (1849-1916)
 Carrie Williams Lewis (b. 1856), who married Fred W. Lebrick

Lewis died in Fond du Lac on December 16, 1888.

References 

1820 births
1888 deaths
Wisconsin postmasters
Businesspeople from Wisconsin
Members of the Wisconsin State Assembly
Politicians from Fond du Lac, Wisconsin
People from Morrisville, New York
Wisconsin Reformers (19th century)
19th-century American politicians
19th-century American businesspeople